Mark Thomas Steketee (born 17 January 1994) is an Australian cricketer. He plays for Queensland. He plays his club cricket for Valley District Cricket Club in Brisbane. During the 2017–18 season, Steketee represented the Cricket Australia XI in the 2017–18 JLT One-Day Cup.

Instead of playing for Queensland in the 2017–18 JLT One-Day Cup, Steketee was named in the Cricket Australia XI team. He played four matches for them, taking five wickets at an average of 38.40 and conceding 6.06 runs per over. In November 2019, in the 2019–20 Sheffield Shield season match against Tasmania, Steketee took his first five-wicket haul in first-class cricket.

In January 2021, Steketee was named in Australia's Test squad for their series against South Africa. The following month, he was also added to Australia's Test squad for their series against Pakistan. In March 2022, Steketee was signed by Essex County Cricket Club to play in their first six matches of the County Championship in England.

References

1994 births
Living people
Australian cricketers
Queensland cricketers
Brisbane Heat cricketers
Essex cricketers
People from Warwick, Queensland